This is a list of philosophy-related events in the 12th century. Philosophy at the time was influenced by the ongoing crusades.

Events

Publications 
The Incoherence of the Incoherence, the landmark harmonization of philosophy and faith by Averroes
Sic et Non, Peter Abelard's scholastic study of apparent contradictions in Christian theology

Births 
Averroes (1126–1198), Andalusian polymath.
Zhu Xi (1130–1200), Neo-Confucian philosopher, politician, and writer of the Song dynasty.
Maimonides (1135 or 1138–1204), rabbi, physician and philosopher from Córdoba.

Deaths 
 Peter Abelard (1079-1142). French scholastic philosopher, theologian and preeminent logician.
 Hildegard of Bingen (1098–1179), German Benedictine abbess and polymath, the founder of scientific natural history in Germany.
Averroes (1126–1198), Andalusian polymath.

See also
List of centuries in philosophy

References 
Peter Dronke (ed). A History of Twelfth-Century Western Philosophy. Cambridge University Press. 1988.
Frederick Denison Maurice. Moral and Metaphysical Philosophy. Macmillan and Co. London. 1873. Volume 1 (Ancient philosophy and the first to the thirteenth centuries). Chapter 4 ("Twelfth Century"). Page 534 et seq.

Medieval philosophy
Philosophy by century